No. 511 Squadron was a Royal Air Force transport squadron, active during World War II, the Berlin Airlift and during the sixties and early seventies. It operated, during its three periods of existence, aircraft such as the Douglas Dakota, the Avro York, the Handley Page Hastings and the Bristol Britannia.

History

In World War II

Formed on 14 October 1942, No. 511 Squadron was formed from No. 1425 Flight at RAF Lyneham. The squadron continued the work of the Flight operating regular transport schedules to Gibraltar using the Consolidated Liberators. To extend the route from Gibraltar to Malta the squadron also operated the Armstrong Whitworth Albemarle. As the Second World War progressed, no. 511 Squadron expanded its long-range transport role and it was the first squadron to operate the Avro York transport (A transport based on the Avro Lancaster). At first the Liberators and Yorks were operated as separate Flights, but the Liberator Flight became 246 Squadron in 1944. The squadron continued to fly trooping flights, particularly between the United Kingdom and India until the squadron was disbanded on 7 October 1946.

Post-war 1: On Yorks and Hastings

Within a few days (16 October 1946) the squadron was formed again as an Avro York operator based at RAF Lyneham. It continued to fly the long-distance routes to India and the Far East until, like a lot of transport squadrons, it became involved in the Berlin Airlift.

The squadron was then re-equipped with the Handley Page Hastings in September 1949 and in 1957 the squadron moved to join other operators of the Hastings at RAF Colerne. A year later the squadron disbanded when it was re-numbered to 36 Squadron on 1 September 1958.

Post-war 2: Comes the Britannia

The squadron was formed again at RAF Lyneham on 15 December 1959, as the second squadron to operate the Bristol Britannia on long-range trooping flights. It moved out of RAF Lyneham for RAF Brize Norton in June 1970, as Lyneham became the base for the new Lockheed Hercules. The squadron was disbanded on 6 January 1976, when it was decided to withdraw the Britannia from service.

Aircraft operated

Squadron bases

Commanding officers

See also
1943 B-24 crash in Gibraltar
List of Royal Air Force aircraft squadrons

References

Notes

Bibliography

 The Illustrated Encyclopedia of Aircraft, (Part Work 1982–1985), Orbis Publishing

External links

 History of No.'s 500–520 Squadrons at RAF Web
 Markings and aircraft for No. 511 Squadron on RAFWeb
 511 Squadron history on MOD site

Aircraft squadrons of the Royal Air Force in World War II
Transport units and formations of the Royal Air Force
511
Military units and formations established in 1942